The Kumanovo dialect (Kumanovski dijalekt) is a member of the eastern subgroup of the Northern group of dialects of Macedonian. It belongs to the so-called Prizren-Timok dialects, also known as Torlakian. The dialect is typical for the northern dialect of Macedonian and is very well known because  of the use of some cases, such as the locative case. The Kumanovo dialect is spoken mainly in the city of Kumanovo and the surrounding villages. The dialect is closely related to the neighboring Kriva Palanka dialect. The Kumanovo dialect can be found in literary works, such as the famous play “Lenče Kumanovče” written by Vasil Iljoski in 1928. The Kumanovo dialect is especially popular as a source of humor in the spoken media, whereas the print media tend to favor Western dialect forms for humorous anecdotes and quotations in local news stories. The most significant example where the Kumanovo dialect is used in a humorous way is the festival Tumba Fest.

Phonological characteristics
use of A instead of E: трева / treva > трава / trava;
use of the letter U instead of the letter A as a reflex of Proto-Slavic *ǫ: рака  / raka > рука / ruka (hand), пат  / pat > пут / put (road);
the old syllabic L is changed into U/ LU/ LA: волк / volk > вук / vuk (wolf), сонце / sonce > сл'нце / sl'nce (sun).
use of palatal J at the beginning of the word: јазик  / jazik > език / ezik (tongue),

Morphological characteristics
use of the suffix -V in third-person plural: тие имаа / tie imaa > они имава/имасва / oni imava/imasva (they had);
use of the suffix E for plural feminine nouns instead of the suffix -I: торби/ torbi > торбе / torbe (bags).
Use of KUDE instead of KADE (where).
Use of the forms gu and ga instead of the forms go and i: њега га виде / njega ga vide (I saw him).

Personal pronouns

Possessive pronouns

Demonstrative pronouns

Nominal inflection

Adjectival inflection

Examples of the dialect

A song that is very well known in North Macedonia and typical for the Kumanovo dialect:
Три невесте тикве брале, бре
три невесте тикве брале, бре
три невесте тикве брале, бре, бре, бре
тикве брале, бре.

Куде брале туј заспале, бре
куде брале туј заспале, бре
куде брале туј заспале, бре, бре, бре
туј заспале, бре.

Phrases
Кумановци не се претопуев лăко, на свој дијалект зборив куде и да су
Kumanovci ne se pretopuev lăko, na svoj dijalekt zboriv kude i da su ("The people from Kumanovo cannot be assimilated easily, they speak their own dialect wherever they are")
Полăко ќе научиш англиски да пишуеш и читаш неголи кумановски
Polăko ḱe naučiš angliski da pišueš i čitaš negoli kumanovski ("You will learn to write and read English more easily than the Kumanovo dialect")

References

Dialects of the Macedonian language
Kumanovo
Kumanovo Municipality